"Memo from Turner" is a solo single by Mick Jagger, featuring slide guitar by Ry Cooder, from the soundtrack of Performance, in which Jagger played the leading role of Turner, a reclusive rock star. It was re-released in October 2007 on a 17-song retrospective compilation album The Very Best of Mick Jagger, making a re-appearance as a Jagger solo effort. After its original release in 1970, it was included on Rolling Stones compilations, such as Singles Collection: The London Years as a track credited to the Jagger/Richards songwriting partnership. "Memo from Turner" was ranked No. 92 in the 100 Greatest Guitar Songs list of Rolling Stone.

Music critic Robert Christgau has said, "Jagger's version of Jagger–Richard's scabrous, persona-twisted "Memo From Turner" is his envoi to the 60s."

Versions 
Three versions of "Memo from Turner" have been released, and another "Alternative Take" version is available on bootleg recordings.

The first version, which is not officially released, is a slow, brooding version recorded by members of the band Traffic. It features Steve Winwood on all instruments except drums, which are played by Jim Capaldi. The second version, released on Metamorphosis in 1975 on the Allen Klein Decca/London pre-existing legacy contracts of the Stones 1960s recordings, was a different version recorded by The Rolling Stones in November 1968, and has a looser feel than the released version. This version supposedly features Al Kooper on guitar, and perhaps Keith Richards as well.  Either Charlie Watts or Capaldi plays drums on this recording. Credited to "Jagger/Richards", it is not clear how many of the Rolling Stones besides Jagger actually played on it.

The third version of the song, typified by its slide guitar, was the one recorded for the soundtrack to the film Performance, starring Mick Jagger as the song title's "Turner". It is featured prominently in the movie, with Mick Jagger, as Turner, lip-synching it. This is the more well-known version of the song, as it was released as a solo single by Jagger in England in 1970 and is featured on the later Singles Collection: The London Years. This track was recorded in Los Angeles in early 1970, and uses the vocal track of the first, slow version. The tape of Jagger's vocals was sent to Jack Nitzsche, where all music parts were recorded by Ry Cooder on slide guitar, Russ Titelman (guitar), Randy Newman (piano), Jerry Scheff (bass) and Gene Parsons (drums).

Besides the differing lineup between the two released versions, there are also slight changes to the lyrics. The track was reviewed as Jagger: 
...puts on his best drawling speak-sing voice for the lyrics, spinning bizarre mini-snapshots of decadent, cruel gangster behavior... The music isn't grim, though; it's more in a sly, ironic happy-go-lucky vein, as if to illustrate the callous, carefree glee gangsters take in such antics. It's not a celebration of the gangster mentality, though, so much as a subtle, mocking look at its decadence, with hints of repressed homosexuality and almost gruesome imagery of dog-eat-dog behavior. 

The lyric about "the man who works the soft machine" may be a reference to the William S. Burroughs novel The Soft Machine. Burroughs and writer Robert Palmer assume this connection in a 1972 Rolling Stone magazine interview, and strong Burroughsian themes are contained in the film.

Ronnie Wood performed "Memo from Turner" live at various club gigs in 1987–88, including some of his shows with Bo Diddley.

Martin Scorsese used the track—the solo version by Mick Jagger, incorrectly credited as the Rolling Stones version—in a scene from Goodfellas where Ray Liotta's character Henry Hill is driving to the hospital to pick up his brother after unsuccessfully trying to sell some pistol silencers to Jimmy Conway.

Cover versions
Dramarama covered the song on their 1991 album Vinyl. British band Diesel Park West covered the song on their outtakes album Flipped. Deborah Harry performed this song on several shows from her 'Debravation tour' (1993-1994).  A softer cover was performed by Patty Palladin just before & during the credits of "Donald Cammell: The Ultimate Performance" (Kevin Macdonald, Chris Rodley, 1998).  This was a documentary about Donald Cammell, who directed Performance (1970), which starred Mick Jagger (among others).

References

External links 
 "Memo from Turner" at Discogs (list of recordings)

The Rolling Stones songs
LGBT-related songs
Songs about BDSM
Mick Jagger songs
Decca Records singles
1968 songs
1970 singles
Songs written by Jagger–Richards
Song recordings produced by Jimmy Miller
Song recordings produced by Jack Nitzsche